Renigunta mandal is one of the 34 mandals in Tirupati district of the Indian state of Andhra Pradesh. Its headquarters are located at Renigunta, suburb of Tirupati.. The mandal is bounded by Tirupati (urban), Tirupati (urban), Vadamalapeta, Yerpedu.This mandal is located at Srikalahasti revenue division.

Demographics 

 census, the mandal had a population of 75,789. The total population constitute, 38,090 males and 37,699 females —a sex ratio of 990 females per 1000 males. 8,365 children are in the age group of 0–6 years, of which 4,276 are boys and 4,089 are girls —a ratio of 956 per 1000. The average literacy rate stands at 76.11% with 51,318 literates.

Towns and villages 

 census, the mandal has 32 settlements. It includes 1 town and 31 villages. The populated villages in the mandal are in the vicinity of Tirupati city.

The settlements in the mandal are listed below:

''

See also 
List of mandals in Andhra Pradesh

References

Mandals in Tirupati district